Xylosma pininsularis is a species of flowering plant in the family Salicaceae. It is endemic to New Caledonia.

References

pininsularis
Endemic flora of New Caledonia
Critically endangered flora of Oceania
Taxonomy articles created by Polbot